The 2011 Southeastern Louisiana Lions football team represented Southeastern Louisiana University as a member of the Southland Conference during the 2011 NCAA Division I FCS football season. The Lions were led by fifth-year head coach Mike Lucas and played their home games at Strawberry Stadium. They compiled an overall record of 3–8 with a mark of 1–6 in conference play to place seventh in the Southland. At the conclusion of the season, on November 21, Lucas was released from his duties as head coach.

Schedule

References

Southeastern Louisiana
Southeastern Louisiana Lions football seasons
Southeastern Louisiana Lions football